The Western Suburbs Soccer Club was an Australian association football club based in Sydney. The club was a foundation member of Australia's National Soccer League in 1977, and had previously played in the NSW Premier League (then NSW Division 1) and the NSW State League Division One (then NSW Division 2). Western Suburbs amalgamated with APIA Leichhardt Tigers FC at the end of 1978 NSL season.

Honours
Ampol Cup Winner: 1971, 1976.
NSW State League Runner-Up: 1971 (lost grand final to St George Budapest 3–2).
Federation Cup Runner-Up: 1975.
NSW Division 1 Champion: 1970.

Notable former players
Peter Wilson
Colin Curran
Dave Harding
Brian O'Donnell

References

External links

Western Suburbs SC (NSW)
Defunct soccer clubs in Australia
National Soccer League (Australia) teams
Soccer clubs in Sydney
1978 disestablishments in Australia